Negovski Vrh is a small settlement in the Municipality of Benedikt in northeastern Slovenia. It lies in the Slovene Hills. The area is part of the traditional region of Styria. The entire municipality is now included in the Drava Statistical Region.

References

External links
Negovski Vrh at Geopedia

Populated places in the Municipality of Benedikt